Giraffimyiella is a genus of flies belonging to the family Lesser Dung flies.

Species
G. giraffa (Richards, 1938)

References

Sphaeroceridae
Diptera of Africa
Schizophora genera